The Sun 2500 is a French sailboat that was designed by Olivier Petit as a cruiser and first built in 2004.

Production
The design was built by Jeanneau in France, starting in 2004 and ending in 2008.

Design
The Sun 2500 is a recreational sailboat, built predominantly of polyester fiberglass. The hull is made from solid fiberglass, while the deck is a balsa-fiberglass sandwich. It has a 9/10 fractional sloop rig, with a deck-stepped mast, a single set of swept spreaders and aluminum spars with continuous stainless steel wire  rigging. The hull has a plumb stem and transom, dual spade rudders controlled by a tiller and a stub keel with a retractable centerboard or an optional fixed "L"-shaped keel. The fin keel model displaces  and carries  of ballast, while the centerboard version displaces  and carries  of ballast.

The boat is normally fitted with a small  outboard motor or optional inboard engine for docking and maneuvering.

The design has sleeping accommodation for four people, with a double "V"-berth in the bow around a teardrop table and a double berth aft on the part side. The galley is located on the port side at the companionway ladder and is equipped with a single burner stove and a small sink. The enclosed head is located just aft of the companionway on the starboard side.

The design has a hull speed of

See also
List of sailing boat types

References

External links

Keelboats
2000s sailboat type designs
Sailing yachts
Sailboat type designs by Olivier Petit
Sailboat types built by Jeanneau